The Ngero–Vitiaz languages form a linkage of Austronesian languages in northern Papua New Guinea. They are spoken, from west to east, in Madang Province, Morobe Province, and New Britain.

Classification
According to Lynch, Ross, & Crowley (2002), the structure of the family is as follows:

Ngero family
Bariai linkage: Bariai, Kove, Lusi, Malalamai
Tuam linkage: Gitua, Mutu
Vitiaz linkage
Bel family
Astrolabe (East Bel) linkage: Awad Bing, Mindiri, Wab
Nuclear Bel (West Bel) linkage: Marik (Dami, Ham), Gedaged, Bilibil, Takia, Matukar
Southwest New Britain linkage
Bibling linkage: Lamogai, Mouk-Aria
Pasismanua linkage: Aigon, Miu, Kaulong–Karore, Sengseng
Arawe linkage:
East Arawe: Akolet, Avau, Bebeli, Lesing-Gelimi
West Arawe: Solong, Apalik (Ambul), Gimi, Aiklep
?Mangseng
Mengen family:  Lote, Mamusi, Mengen
Maleu
Korap linkage: Arop-Lukep, Karnai, Malasanga, Mur Pano
Mbula
Roinji–Nenaya: Mato, Ronji
Sio
Tami
Amara

References

 
North New Guinea languages
Languages of Papua New Guinea